Blue Light Boogie is an album by American blues artist Taj Mahal.

Track listing

References

Taj Mahal (musician) albums
1999 albums